The Equality Party was a left-wing political party in Chile. It was founded in 2009 by various social movements of workers, students, mortgage borrowers, townspeople and human rights organizations, among other actors. Its first president was former communist councilor of Peñalolen, Lautaro Guanca.

Legally registered in 2012, it first appeared in the municipal elections of that year. Reaching 0.81% of the vote, it got the election of one councilor.

For the 2013 elections, the party proclaimed Roxana Miranda as its presidential candidate. The party joined the Broad Front and supported Beatriz Sánchez for President in 2017, winning a seat in the lower house.

The party was dissolved in February 2022 because it did not receive at least 5% of the votes in the 2021 parliamentary elections to maintain its legality.

Presidential candidates 
The following is a list of the presidential candidates supported by the Equality Party. (Information gathered from the Archive of Chilean Elections).
2013: Roxana Miranda (lost)
2017: Beatriz Sánchez (lost)
2021: none

Electoral history

Presidential

Parliamentary

Constitutional Convention

References

External links

Partido Igualdad 

2009 establishments in Chile
Political parties established in 2009
Political parties in Chile
Socialist parties in Chile
Political parties disestablished in 2022